The following is a list of films produced in the Kannada film industry in India in 1965, presented in alphabetical order.

See also
Kannada films of 1964
Kannada films of 1966

References

External links
 Kannada Movies of 1965's at the Internet Movie Database
 http://www.bharatmovies.com/kannada/info/moviepages.htm
 http://www.kannadastore.com/

1965
Kannada
Films, Kannada